Falkland Cricket Association is the official governing body of the sport of cricket in the Falkland Islands. It is the Island's representative at the International Cricket Council, of which it is an associate member, having joined in 2007. It is included in the ICC Americas region.

In 2010 the Falkland Cricket Association appointed a development officer, with the aim of having 100% participation of school-age children in school cricket, for a minimum of 6 weeks a year.  Falkland Cricket Association official Roger Diggle commented, "We think we might be the first country in the world to achieve 100% participation at school age."

References

External links
Cricinfo-Falkland Islands

Cricket administration